The 1983 South Australian Soccer Federation season was the 77th season of soccer in South Australia. It was managed by the South Australian Soccer Federation. In addition to the three men's divisions, the Summer Night Series and Federation Cup were also contested.

The Ampol Cup began in February and was won by Eastern Districts Azzurri, who beat Adelaide City 1–0 in the final on 23 March. A week after the conclusion of the Ampol Cup, the second division began, with the first division commencing three weeks later. The first division was won by Beograd Woodville, who lost in the semi-finals of the Coca-Cola Top Four Cup. The second division was won by Salisbury United. A week after the conclusion of the league competitions, the Federation Cup final was held between Beograd Woodville, who were first division champions, and Salisbury United, who were second division champions. Beograd Woodville won the game 1–0.

Two Football League First Division veterans cameoed for teams in South Australia this season. Mike Channon for Salisbury United, scoring twice in their 4–3 win over Elizabeth City on 17 July. The second player was George Best, who played for West Adelaide Hellas in their 5–3 win over rivals Adelaide City, scoring a penalty in front of a crowd of 5,000 people at Hindmarsh Stadium on 20 July.

1983 SASF Division One

The 1983 South Australian Division One season was the top level domestic association football competition in South Australia for 1983. It was contested by 10 teams in a 18-round league format, each team playing all of their opponents twice.

Beograd Woodville won their second first division title, their first being in 1979, beating out Adelaide Croatia by goal difference on the final matchday. There was no relegation this season, as the league expanded to 12 teams for the 1984 season.

League table

1983 Top Four Cup

The 1983 Top Four Cup, known as the 1983 Coca-Cola Cup, was the 15th edition of the Top Four Cup, a post-season knockout competition contested by the top four teams from the Division One season.

The tournament was won by Polonia Adelaide, who beat Adelaide Croatia 3–1 in the final, having previously beaten Division One champions Beograd Woodville in the semi-finals. This was Polonia's third Top Four Cup title, having won it back-to-back in 1977 and 1978.

Bracket
{{4TeamBracket
|RD1-seed1=2
|RD1-team1=Adelaide Croatia
|RD1-score1=2
|RD1-seed2=4
|RD1-team2=Para Hills Knights
|RD1-score2=1
|RD1-seed3=1
|RD1-team3=Beograd Woodville
|RD1-score3=0
|RD1-seed4=3
|RD1-team4=Polonia Adelaide
|RD1-score4=2
|RD2-seed1=2
|RD2-team1=Adelaide Croatia|RD2-score1=1
|RD2-seed2=3
|RD2-team2=Polonia Adelaide|RD2-score2=3}}

1983 SASF Division Two

The 1983 South Australian Division Two season was the second level domestic association football competition in South Australia for 1983. It was contested by 12 teams in a 22-round league format, each team playing all of their opponents twice.

Salisbury United won the title, beating out National Soccer League team Adelaide City, who beat out Cumberland United by goal difference. Both teams were promoted to the first division for next season, being the two expansion teams as the division increased from 10 to 12 teams. Sturt withdrew from SASF competitions before the beginning of next season.

League table

1983 SASF Metropolitan League

The 1983 South Australian Metropolitan League season was the third level domestic association football competition in South Australia for 1983. It was contested by 12 teams in a 22-round league format, each team playing all of their opponents twice. This was the final season of the metropolitan league before it folded.

League table

1983 Summer Night Series

The 1983 Summer Night Series, known as the Ampol Cup, was the 31st edition of the Summer Night Series, a pre-season tournament contested by 8 teams from Division One and Division Two.

Group stage

Group A

Group B

Playoffs

1983 Federation Cup

The 1983 South Australian Soccer Federation Cup, known as the P.G.H. Cup''', was the 71st running of the Federation Cup, the main soccer knockout competition in South Australia. Teams from Division One, Division Two, Metropolitan League. Regional Leagues and Amateur Leagues participated.

Beograd Woodville won their third title, defeating Salisbury United 1–0 in the final.

Bracket

1983 Federation Cup Final

References

1983 in Australian soccer
Football South Australia seasons